Propwash Airport  is a privately owned public airport in Justin, Denton County, Texas, United States, located approximately  west of the central business district. The airport has no IATA or ICAO designation.

The airport is used solely for general aviation purposes.

Facilities 
 Runway 17/35: 3,000 x 60 ft. (914 x 18 m), Surface: Asphalt

For the 12-month period ending December 31, 2015, the airport had 5,300 aircraft operations, an average of 15 per day: 100% general aviation. At that time there were 109 aircraft based at this airport: 86% single-engine, 5% multi-engine, 0% jets, 4% helicopters, 6% ultralights and 0% gliders.

Accidents and incidents 
 1 March 2009: A Nanchang CJ-6, registration number N99YK, entered the traffic pattern to land after leading a 3-aircraft formation to Propwash Airport. During a very steep right turn towards the runway, the aircraft suddenly descended sharply and impacted terrain in a near-vertical nose-down attitude. The pilot and single passenger were killed. The accident was attributed to "The pilot's failure to maintain adequate airspeed while maneuvering on approach, which resulted in an accelerated stall and subsequent loss of control. "

References

External links 
  at Texas DOT Airport Directory

Airports in Texas
Airports in the Dallas–Fort Worth metroplex
Transportation in Denton County, Texas
Privately owned airports